André Bourbeau,  (June 1, 1936 – March 25, 2018) was a Canadian politician. A member of the Quebec Liberal Party, Bourbeau served as member of the National Assembly of Quebec for Laporte serving from 1981 until 2003.

Early life
Bourbeau was born in Verdun, Quebec, the son of Louis-Auguste Bourbeau and Antoinette Miquelon. He studied at the Séminaire de Sherbrooke and the University of Montreal before receiving a Diploma in Law from McGill University in 1959.

Political career
Bourbeau became a notary in 1960 and practiced in Montreal from 1960 to 1981. From 1970 to 1978, he served as a city councillor in Saint-Lambert, Quebec. He was mayor from 1978 to 1981.

In 1981, he was elected to the National Assembly of Quebec for Laporte. A Liberal, he was re-elected in 1985, 1989, 1994, and 1998. He did not run in 2003. He held many different cabinet positions including Minister of Municipal Affairs, Responsible for Housing; Minister of Manpower, Income Security and Vocational Training; and Minister of Finance.

He was the Chairman of the Board at Hydro-Québec from 2003 to 2005. From 1998 to 2003, he was Chairman of the Wilfrid Pelletier Foundation. As well, he was Chairman of the Jeunesses Musicales of Canada Foundation. Bourbeau was the founding president of the Montreal International Music Competition.

Death
Bourbeau was diagnosed with cancer in 1998. He died of complications from cancer on March 25, 2018, at the age of 81.

Honors
In 2009, he was made a Knight of the National Order of Quebec.

In December 2016, Bourbeau was named a Member of the Order of Canada.

Electoral record (partial)

References

1936 births
2018 deaths
French Quebecers
Finance ministers of Quebec
Knights of the National Order of Quebec
Université de Montréal alumni
McGill University Faculty of Law alumni
Quebec Liberal Party MNAs
People from Verdun, Quebec
Politicians from Montreal
21st-century Canadian politicians
Members of the Order of Canada
Members of the Executive Council of Quebec
Deaths from cancer in Quebec